The United Nations Security Council Resolution 2254 was unanimously adopted on 18 December 2015. It calls for a ceasefire and political settlement in Syria. This document describe the roadmap for Syria's political transition. As of 2022, no real progress has been made to implement the resolution.

The resolution

The resolution demanded that all parties immediately cease any attacks against civilian targets, it urged all Member States to support efforts to achieve a ceasefire and requested the U.N. to convene the parties to engage in formal negotiations in early January 2016.

Groups seen as "terrorist groups" by the U.N. Security Council, including the Islamic State of Iraq and the Levant and the al-Nusra Front, were excluded. Offensive and defensive actions against such groups would continue. A mechanism to monitor the ceasefire would be set up.<

Within 18 months, free and fair elections would be held under U.N. supervision. The political transition would be Syrian-led.

Aftermath
The UN Resolution 2254 was invoked by Iran, Russia, and Turkey as the legal basis for the political process required to solve the Syrian conflict, at the first round of the Astana Talks in January 2017."

See also

List of United Nations resolutions concerning Syria
Syrian Constitutional Committee

References

External links
Text of the Resolution at undocs.org

2015 United Nations Security Council resolutions
Syrian peace process
 2254
2015 in Syria
December 2015 events